Ilene Berns (née Holub; May 1, 1943 – February 20, 2017) was a record company director.

Born to a Jewish family in Cleveland, Ohio, Berns worked as a go-go dancer in New York City nightclubs before meeting her husband Bert Berns, the songwriter and record producer and founder of Bang Records. They had three children.

Bert died of heart failure on December 30, 1967, leaving Ilene as a 24-year-old widow. She subsequently re-released material from such Bang Records artists as Van Morrison and Neil Diamond, and discovered Mississippi singer-songwriter Paul Davis.  She relocated Bang Records to Atlanta, Georgia in 1970 and presided over a decade of success with Davis ("Ride 'Em Cowboy", "I Go Crazy", "Sweet Life"); she also signed and developed Atlanta-based R&B funk group Brick ("Dazz") and singer-songwriter Peabo Bryson. She then found David L Cook who came from a long line of recording artists which included the Grand Ole Opry stars, The Cook Family Singers. David was primarily brought onto the label because of his youth which brought a different flair to the label's roster and the additional fact that his vocals sounded almost identical to that of Paul Davis which came in handy later with recordings that needed stacking or voice overs.

Berns sold Bang Records to Columbia Records in 1979. She died in Miami, Florida, in February 2017, aged 73.

References

1943 births
2017 deaths
20th-century American Jews
American music industry executives
Businesspeople from Georgia (U.S. state)
Businesspeople from Cleveland
20th-century American businesspeople
20th-century American businesswomen
21st-century American Jews
21st-century American women